Taiping Hospital, formerly known as Yong Wah Hospital was one of the first hospitals established in Malaysia. Located at Jalan Taming Sari (Main Road) near the commercial town centre, it is one of the biggest hospitals in Malaysia and is the second biggest in the State of Perak. The hospital is strategically situated 80 km from Ipoh and 85 km from Penang and was able to serve the northern states of Malaysia.

History 
Yong Wah Hospital or the Chinese Pauper Hospital was the first established hospital in the Federated Malay States. Established in 1880 to treat the Chinese 'coolies' and tin-miners who were often sick and suffered from various diseases, such as diarrhoea, cholera, malaria, beriberi, dysentery, and pulmonary diseases. Its establishment was developed in parallel with the significant economy growth in the town.

The hospital gained financial support from the Chinese merchants, while the State Government aided provision of medical apparatus, medicines and nursing staff. With consideration to the poor people's welfare, the hospital only charged a minimum fee of 50 cents per annum from the poor 'coolies'. The hospital's policies worked out efficiently for the first six months of its establishment, but it later incurred difficulties collecting the fees. The reason was most 'coolies' were unable to settle their medical fees due to their low income.

Therefore, by the end of the year 1880, the State Government took over full responsibility for the Yong Wah Hospital, and it was shifted to its current location at Main Road, and renamed Taiping General Hospital. The maintenance costs of the hospital were so high, that Sir Hugh Low, the then British Resident of Perak levied an annual capitation fee of one dollar, on everyone who lived in the Taiping district, and a health coupon was produced for those who could pay the fees. The fees were used as a contribution to the expense of maintaining the hospital, with no profit gained from the collections. All food, medicine and attendance was given free-of-charge. The Chinese community, however, strongly objected to this tax, because it was never levied in other Malay states, and the system was later abolished in 1884.

The institution consists of many wards and other buildings arranged in carefully laid out grounds, planted with palms, beautiful trees and flowering shrubs, which are very restful to the eye. The aim of the hospital was to curb diseases from spreading among the 'coolies', reduce the rate of death, and increase the rate of population growth.  The results were positive. The number of deaths and diseases declined gradually in the district, and the rate of birth increased tremendously, and Taiping's economic growth continued to prosper.

The institution was initially run under the supervision of Dr. Hamilton Wright, the first Health Inspector. The hospital was able to sustain 900 patients at a time, according to Sir Cecil Clementi's report during his state visit. In 1881, the hospital under went a major renovation. The overall renovation cost was estimated to have been about 2,100 Straits dollars. By the year 1884, an additional ward and a dispensary were added; the hospital's drainage system was also improved with the total cost of 9,379 Straits dollars.

The same year, there was a total about 13,000 hospital cases in Perak. In Taiping out of a total of 3,068 cases handled by the hospital,  2,501 cases were because of beriberi. The main cause of the beriberi was  malnutrition.  Other diseases were caused by improper sanitation. Taiping also housed a lunatic asylum (within the hospital compound) and a prison hospital (in the prison) under the supervision of Mr Thomas Prendergast. In 1906, the Government medical staff extended the services for outpatients particularly in the rural areas. The percentage of deaths to cases treated was 18.08% in Taiping, compared to other 13 hospitals in Perak.

The number of patients treated in the course of a year ran to many thousands, and the sums expended by the Government on the Medical Department, with all its surgeons and assistants, nurses, dispensers, dressers, attendants, cooks, gardeners, gate-keepers, etc., amounted to a very large total. It was reported that many of the government's funds flowed to the hospital.

Therefore, by the year 1890, a Sanitary Board was established to control and monitor the health and cleanliness of the town. On 3 February 1896, the hospital installed its first X-Ray equipment, and indeed was the first hospital in Malaya and also Far East Asia to have those facilities. Mr. Leonard Wray chaired the opening ceremony, and the first 'patient' who was X-Rayed was a pomfret fish.

In 1906, the Medical Department reported that 318,000 Straits dollars were to be granted to Perak for development in every sector. Good health care was thus facilitated by the Government.  By a year later, the population in Taiping, as well as elsewhere in Perak, had increased as a result.   Taiping's pioneering example of a successful health institution was later adopted by other towns in Malaya, and now almost every town in Malaya has a hospital.

The Straits Times newspaper on 16 February 1897, quote:

Chronology 
 1880 – The first hospital known as Yong Wah Hospital in the Federated Malay States was established in April 1880 at Taiping, Perak. In December of the same year it was taken over by the State Government and named as Taiping General Hospital and shifted to Main Road.
 1881 – The hospital went a major renovation and suspension.
 1884 – Sir Hugh Low levied a capitation fee of one dollar for the hospital services. The system was later abolished in the same year.
 1890 – Sanitary Board was established to control and monitor the health and cleanliness of the town.
 1897 – On 3 February, the first Roentgen ray apparatus was installed at Taiping. The Straits Times reported that this was probably the first country in the Far East to use Roentgen rays. On 14 February, the first demonstration of X-rays was conducted at the hospital.
 1906 – The medical staff extended the services for outpatients particularly the rural areas in Perak.
 1917 – On 12 June, the Taiping planters' complaint of lack of X-ray facilities in the locality.
 2007 – In the year 2007, the hospital was separated into two major units. The outpatients unit was shifted to a new building at Tupai Road. While, the old building serves as emergency unit and retain at its former location.

Specialties and services 
 Anesthesiology
 Audiology
 Dermatology
 Emergency
 Internal Medicine
 Obstetrics and Gynecology
 Ophthalmology
 Orthopedic
 Otorhinolaryngology
 Pathology
 Pediatric
 Pharmacy
 Physiotherapy
 Psychiatry
 Oral Surgery 
Sports and Exercise Medicine
 Paediatric Dentistry

References 

 Eugene Khoo, 2007 A History of Taiping, Malaysia
 Wright, Arnold, 1908, Twentieth Century Impressions of British Malaya, London
 Perak Annual Reports

External links 
 MOH
  Hospital Taiping
 Taiping Heritage

Hospitals in Perak
Hospital buildings completed in 1884
Hospitals established in 1880
Taiping, Perak